The 2012 Big South Conference men's soccer tournament will be the 29th edition of the tournament.  The tournament will decide the Big South Conference champion and guaranteed representative into the 2012 NCAA Division I Men's Soccer Championship. Held from November 6–11, the semifinal and championship rounds will be held at the Bryan Park Soccer Complex in Greensboro, North Carolina.

Qualification 

As of 18 October 2012Source: Big South(RS) = Regular season champion; (TC) = Tournament championOnly applicable when the season is not finished:
(Q) = Qualified to the phase of tournament indicated; (TQ) = Qualified to tournament, but not yet to the particular phase indicated; (E) = Eliminated

Bracket

Schedule

Quarterfinals

Semifinals

Big South Championship

Statistical leaders

See also 
 Big South Conference
 2012 Big South Conference men's soccer season
 2012 NCAA Division I men's soccer season
 2012 NCAA Division I Men's Soccer Championship

References 

Tournament
Big South Conference Men's Soccer Tournament
Big South Conference Men's Soccer Tournament
2012